Diplazium esculentum, the vegetable fern, is an edible fern found throughout Asia and Oceania. It is probably the most commonly consumed fern. 

The genus Diplazium is in the family Athyriaceae, in the eupolypods II clade of the order Polypodiales, in the class Polypodiopsida.

Description
This plant is a large perennial fern with ascending rhizome of about 50 cm high and covered with short rufous scales of about 1 mm long. The plant is bipinnate with long brownish petioles, and the petiole base is black and covered with short scales. The frond can reach 1.5  m in length, and the pinnae is about 8 cm long and 2 cm wide.

Uses
The young fronds are stir-fried and used in salads.

It is known as  pakô ("wing") in the Philippines, pucuk paku and paku tanjung in Malaysia, sayur paku or pakis in Indonesia, dhekia (ঢেকীয়া) in Assam "Dhenki Shaak (ঢেঁকি শাক) in Bengali ", paloi saag (পালই শাগ) Sylheti, ningro in Nepali,dingkia in Boro and linguda in northern India, referring to the curled fronds. In Thailand it is known as phak koot. They may have mild amounts of fern toxins but no major toxic effects are recorded.

Pharmacological effects
The extract also had alpha-glucosidase inhibitory activity.

Gallery

See also
 Fiddlehead fern
Sphenomeris chinensis

References

esculentum
Flora of tropical Asia
Leaf vegetables
Medicinal plants of Asia
Medicinal plants of Oceania